= Kálmán Hamar =

Hungarian historian (1928–1989)

- Born: October 12, 1928
- Died: June 11, 1989
- Occupation: historian

Kálmán Hamar (October 12, 1928 – June 11, 1989) was a Hungarian historian from Slovakia. He was a professor at the Marx-Lenin Institute of the Bratislava College of Economics, and served as president of the Hungarian Historical Society of Czechoslovakia.

== Biography ==
From 1960 to 1963, Hamar was the head of the Hungarian editorial office of the Slovakian Pedagogical Book Publisher (textbook publisher) in Bratislava where he taught Hungarian.

Hamar was a professor at the Marx-Lenin Institute of the Bratislava College of Economics.

He was first a member of the Bratislava city committee of Csemadok, and then its president. From 1970, he was the first president of the Hungarian Historical Society of Czechoslovakia.

Hamar primarily dealt with labor movement topics considered important at the time,

He is interred in the urn cemetery in Lamac.

== Critics ==
Some criticism was related to his works failing to comply with archived materials.
